Dimitris Kokolakis (alternate spelling: Dimitrios) (Greek: Δημήτρης Κοκολάκης; born November 11, 1949) is a retired Greek professional basketball player. He was born in Rethymno, Greece. At a height of 2.15 m (7 ft.  in.), he played at the center position.

Professional career
Kokolakis joined the Greek League club Panathinaikos in 1969. With Panathinaikos, he won 9 Greek League championships (1971, 1972, 1973, 1974, 1975, 1977, 1980, 1981, 1982), and 3 Greek Cups (1979, 1982, 1983). He then moved to the Greek club Aris in 1983. With Aris, he won 3 more Greek League championships (1985, 1986, 1987), and two more Greek Cups (1985 and 1987).

National team career
Kokolakis was also a member of the senior men's Greek national basketball team. In 178 caps played with Greece's senior men's team, he scored 1,280 points, for an average of 7.2 points per game. He played at the FIBA EuroBasket 1975, the FIBA EuroBasket 1979, the FIBA EuroBasket 1981, and the FIBA EuroBasket 1983. He also played at the 1980 FIBA European Olympic Qualifying Tournament.

Awards and accomplishments

Pro career
12× Greek League Champion: (1971, 1972, 1973, 1974, 1975, 1977, 1980, 1981, 1982, 1985, 1986, 1987)
5× Greek Cup Winner: (1979, 1982, 1983, 1985, 1987)

Greek national team
1979 Mediterranean Games:

References

External links
FIBA Profile
FIBA Europe Profile
Green Legends Dimitris Kokolakis (1969-1983)
Hellenic Basketball Federation Profile 

1949 births
Living people
Aris B.C. players
Centers (basketball)
Greek men's basketball players
Ilysiakos B.C. players
Panathinaikos B.C. players
Mediterranean Games gold medalists for Greece
Mediterranean Games medalists in basketball
Competitors at the 1979 Mediterranean Games
Sportspeople from Rethymno